The doorway effect is a known psychological event where a person's short-term memory declines when passing through a doorway moving from one location to another when it would not if they had remained in the same place.  People experience this effect by forgetting what they were going to do, thinking about, or planning upon entering a different room.  This is thought to be due to the change in one's physical environment, which is used to distinguish boundaries between remembered events: memories of events encountered in the present environment are more accessible than those beyond it.

Memory experience is structured around a series of events or episodes (attending a talk or having a meal with family), in contrast to the continuous stream of behaviour and perception punctuated by periods of sleep. This mechanism, referred to as episodic memory, refers to the reception and storage of information regarding temporarily dated events, and the temporal-spatial relations between them. A number of psychological studies have suggested that external context (including location) plays a significant role in the compartmentalisation of memories. Thus, spatial changes to a different location may act as a boundary marker to segment continuous information.  

Studies of the doorway effect have had individuals navigate virtual environments while picking up and setting down objects of various colours and shapes, entering and leaving different rooms while doing so. Participants in these experiments were presented with the names of these objects either (1) across a large room or (2) upon entering a new room (spatial change). They were then required to respond "yes" or "no" with respect to whether the named object matched the one they had carried and eventually set down.

Findings indicating doorways act as event boundaries contribute towards wider understanding of memory construction and retention. They indicate the significance of structures of the surrounding environment in how memories are objectively recalled, alongside how it is subjectively recalled: the valence of emotions, specific emotion felt, its intensity and duration.

Theories and studies 
In 2006, Gabriel A. Radvansky and David E. Copeland performed the first studies showing information of objects became less accessible upon dissociation from the person and presence of a spatial shift. This was measured by the moving of objects through virtual rooms.

Radvansky and Copeland presented participants with brief narratives that either associated or dissociated an object from the participant. For example, one could wear a sweatshirt (associated), remove it (dissociated) and go for a run. Explicit measures in the form of memory probes and comprehension ability when answering questions, alongside implicit measures including reading times were assessed. Results showed that information about the object became less available under situations of dissociation, compared to association. Such patterns aligned with existing literature showing the disruption caused by spatial shifts in cognitive processing. Despite this, it remained unclear to what degree the spatial effect observed was caused by the association/dissociation between an object and the participant and/or its spatial shift. Thus, Radvansky and Copeland separated the two components for independent assessment.  

To do this, rooms of varying sizes were introduced, amounting to a virtual removal of walls and doorways so that distance remained the same although different spatial shifts were imposed. Radvansky and Copeland concluded that there continued to be an effect regarding an object's association/dissociation to the participant, and at the same time, also stated that there was: "fairly clear evidence that moving through a doorway from one region to the next made information that would otherwise be highly available less available".

Real world effects 
Separate studies on the presence of a doorway effect elicited incongruences with typical rhythms of life. Some suggest it may be reasonable to expect that humans should instead be rather facile with dealing with movement from one location to another, and its effects on memory recall – especially with objects one was recently carrying. It has been separately proposed that the doorway effect might be attributed to self-preservation behaviours, evoking alertness towards the lurking of predators on the edge of openings when crossing such thresholds. Hence, guiding one's attention from an internal to external perspective. Implications extend to realms of verbal learning and comprehension, whereby the presence of the effect even on small, short-term memory loads, demonstrates the importance of one's environment on subsequent performance especially for more complex tasks (recalling exam material, interpersonal details, human engagement etc.).

Implications of physical environment with memory extend its role in eliciting revealed behaviours including notions of cognitive empathy gaps, which are underlined by deviations in mentalising processes of one's emotive states. Examples of how broader contributions to the relations between environment, memory, and behaviour were demonstrated by London-based behavioural consultancy, Cowry Consulting's "Preventing falls with pink walls" project that aimed to reduce unsafe behaviour at construction sites. Changes to the physical environment were made by painting break room walls "Baker Miller pink", restructuring with plants, softer lighting, and communal tables to differentially segment the space were seen "to reduce anxiety, stress and aggression".

Further Research 
In a 2021 study, researchers at Bond University tried to replicate the doorway effect in four experiments: in both physical rooms and virtual rooms, and both with and without the participants doing a “distractor task” (counting backwards).  In one experiment -- in virtual rooms, and with a distractor task -- doorways caused a statistically significant increase in false positives (i.e., false memories), but not false negatives (i.e., forgetting).  In the other three experiments, doorways had no effect.  The researchers suggested that this was consistent with real life, in which "we might occasionally forget a single item we had in mind after walking into a new room but, crucially, this usually happens when we have other things on our mind . . . ."

One of the study authors, psychologist Oliver Baumann, speculated that it might be “possible to ‘immunise’ yourself against forgetting.  ‘“If we are single-minded in what we want to do, nothing will stop us remembering.  But if we have multiple things going on, forgetfulness becomes noticeable.’”

References

Memory biases